Hays Glacier is a glacier flowing north into the head of Spooner Bay, Enderby Land, Antarctica. It was plotted from air photos taken by the Australian National Antarctic Research Expeditions (ANARE) in 1956, and was named for J. Hays, a United States observer with the ANARE (Thala Dan, 1961) which made a landing nearby.

 Latitude:	674000S
 Longitude:	0461800E
 Description:	Glacier flowing N into the head of Spooner Bay, Enderby Land. Plotted from air photos taken by Australian National Antarctic Research Expeditions (ANARE) in 1956. Named for J. Hays, United States observer with the Australian National Antarctic Research Expeditions (ANARE) (Thala Dan, 1961) which made a landing nearby.

See also
 List of glaciers in the Antarctic
 Glaciology

References

Glaciers of Enderby Land